Grandtully railway station served the village of Grandtully, Perthshire, Scotland from 1865 to 1965 on the Inverness and Perth Junction Railway.

History 
The station first opened on 1 July 1865 by the Inverness and Perth Junction Railway but only a few trains ran in the evening. The full service was introduced two days later, on 3 July. It closed to both passengers and goods traffic on 3 May 1965.

References

External links 

Disused railway stations in Perth and Kinross
Railway stations in Great Britain opened in 1865
Railway stations in Great Britain closed in 1965
Beeching closures in Scotland
1865 establishments in Scotland
1965 disestablishments in Scotland
Former Highland Railway stations